Qallu Urqu (Quechua qallu tongue urqu mountain, "tongue mountain", also spelled Gallo Orkho) is a  mountain in the Bolivian Andes which reaches a height of approximately . It is located in the Chuquisaca Department, at the border of the Jaime Zudáñez Province, Icla Municipality, and the Tomina Province, Sopachuy Municipality.

References 

Mountains of Chuquisaca Department